Lisa Webb (born 27 April 1984) is a former Australian rules footballer and current senior coach of the Fremantle Football Club in the AFL Women's (AFLW).

Early life
Webb placed second at the 2002–03 Australian Track & Field Championships competing in the Heptathlon.

Playing career
Webb was drafted by Fremantle with their first selection and the second selection overall in the 2017 AFL Women's rookie draft. She played six games in 2018. She was delisted at the end of the 2018 season.

Coaching career
In 2019, Webb was appointed as the opposition and strategy coach for the Fremantle AFLW team. She remained a assistant until June 2022, when she relocated to Melbourne for family reasons. She served as the Western Bulldogs AFLW midfield coach in Season 7.

In February 2023, Webb was appointed senior coach of the Fremantle AFLW team on a three-year deal.

Personal life
Webb is the wife of former player Marc Webb. They have two sons.

Webb was a health and physical education teacher at Newman College in Perth up until June 2022.

References

External links 

1984 births
Living people
Fremantle Football Club (AFLW) players
Australian rules footballers from Western Australia